was a semimonthly seinen manga magazine, published in Japan from April 1, 1998, until October 19, 2004, by Kodansha.

List of serialized manga
 Piano no Mori by Makoto Isshiki (1998-2004), (moved to Weekly Morning after the cancellation of the magazine)
 Garōden by Keisuke Itagaki and Baku Yumemakura (1999-2004), (moved to Evening after the cancellation of the magazine)
 Hana Usagi by Kentarō Kobayashi (1999-2004)
 Gregory Horror Show by Naomi Iwata (2000)
 Inu Neko Jump! by Mitsuru Hattori (2000-2001)
 Rose Hip Rose by Tooru Fujisawa (2002-2003)
 Otogi no Machi no Rena by Mitsuru Hattori (2002-2004)
 Basilisk (manga) by Masaki Segawa (2003-2004)
 Majokko Tsukune-chan by Hiroaki Magari (2003-2004), (moved to Monthly Shōnen Sirius after the cancellation of the magazine)

References

1998 establishments in Japan
2004 disestablishments in Japan
Defunct magazines published in Japan
Semimonthly manga magazines published in Japan
Kodansha magazines
Magazines established in 1998
Magazines disestablished in 2004
Seinen manga magazines